Osaka Gas Soccer Club is a Japanese football club based in Osaka. The club has played in Japan Soccer League Division 2. Currently plays in Japanese Prefectural Leagues.

External links
Football of Japan

Football clubs in Japan
Japan Soccer League clubs
Japan Football League (1992–1998) clubs
Sports teams in Osaka
Works association football clubs in Japan